Friedrich Robert Mauz (1 May 1900 Esslingen – 7 July 1979 Münster) was a German psychiatrist who was involved with the Nazi T-4 Euthanasia Program.

From 1939 until 1945, Mauz was the Professor of Psychiatry at Albertina University in Königsberg.  In 1953, he became the Professor of Psychiatry at Münster.

He was the president (1957-1958) of the German Society for Psychiatrists and Neurologists.
Mauz was father of three children, one son and two daughters. His son Gerhard Mauz (1925–2003) was a court reporter for Der Spiegel magazine.

See also 
Psychiatry
racial policy of Nazi Germany
T-4 Euthanasia Program

References

German psychiatrists
Physicians in the Nazi Party
People of Nazi Germany
1900 births
1979 deaths
Academic staff of the University of Münster
Aktion T4 personnel
20th-century Freikorps personnel